This is a list of the Australian species of the family Blastodacnidae. It also acts as an index to the species articles and forms part of the full List of moths of Australia.

Chrysoclista monotyla Meyrick, 1921
Microcolona arizela Meyrick, 1897
Microcolona celaenospila Turner, 1916
Microcolona characta Meyrick, 1897
Microcolona crypsicasis Meyrick, 1897
Microcolona embolopis Meyrick, 1897
Microcolona epixutha Meyrick, 1897
Microcolona leptopis Meyrick, 1897
Microcolona leucochtha Meyrick, 1897
Microcolona nodata Meyrick, 1897
Microcolona polygethes Turner, 1939
Microcolona ponophora Meyrick, 1897
Microcolona sollennis Meyrick, 1897
Microcolona spaniospila Turner, 1923
Microcolona thymopis Meyrick, 1897
Microcolona toropis (Meyrick, 1897)
Microcolona trigonospila Meyrick, 1897
Zaratha crotolitha Meyrick, 1915
Zaratha trisecta Meyrick, 1915

External links 
Blastodacnidae at Australian Faunal Directory

Australia